Za Pakhtoon Yum (Pashto: زہ پښتون يم) which means "I am Pashtun" is a Pakistani Pashto language drama serial, starring  Azeem Sajad, Raheel Khan, Tariq Jamal, Maya Khan, Maria Khan. It originally aired on the AVT Khyber. Za Pakhtoon Yum is the first HD Pashto action drama based on society issues.

References

Pashto cinema
Pakistani drama television series